The 24th Mixed Brigade was a military unit of the Imperial Japanese Army.

History
This Mixed Brigade was sent by the 12th Division from Japan to the Battle of Shanghai in 1932.

Organization
24th Mixed Brigade – ?, 3,000 troops
 2nd Battalion / 14th Infantry Regiment 
 1st Battalion / 24th Infantry Regiment 
 1st Battalion / 46th Infantry Regiment 
 1st Battalion / 48th Infantry Regiment 
 1 Squadron Cavalry
 2nd Battalion / 3rd Independent Mountain Gun Regiment (two Batteries)
 2nd Company / 18th Engineer Battalion

See also
Mixed Brigades (Imperial Japanese Army)
List of Japanese Mixed Brigades

References

External links 
   Axis History Forum: SHANGHAI 1932

Japanese World War II brigades
J